Bernhard ("Ben") Hendrikus Martinus Spijkers (born 10 March 1961 in Nijmegen, Gelderland) is a retired judoka from the Netherlands, who represented his native country at three consecutive Summer Olympics (1984, 1988 and 1992). He won the bronze medal in the men's middleweight division (– 86 kg) in Seoul, South Korea (1988), alongside Akinobu Osako from Japan.

In 1995, Spijkers tried his hand at mixed martial arts competition by competing in the World Combat Championship and Shooto events.

Mixed martial arts career
Spijkers had his MMA debut in the Japanese promotion Shooto against the veteran Erik Paulson. Cornered by Gerard Gordeau, Ben rushed Paulson through the fight with multiple takedown attempts, along with brawling style punches and some hip tosses which connected. However, Erik showed a proficient defense and superior striking, and the fight went outside the ring when the two fell between the ropes and later when Paulson threw Spijkers outside. Ending came at the fifth round when Paulson avoided another takedown attempt and locked a guillotine choke, making Spijkers tap.

Ben's second, and last, MMA fight would be at World Combat Championships (WCC), facing Brazilian jiu-jitsu stylist Renzo Gracie at the first round. Started the match, the judogi-clad Spijkers got a morote gari, but Gracie swept him back to standing and executed his own takedown. Ben tried to counter on the ground with a gi choke, but Renzo took his back and delivered some elbow strikes to the base of the skull before submitting him. Upon the ending of the battle Gracie stepped on the back of Spijkers's head, though later apologized for his unsporting actions. On his return flight to the Netherlands afterwards, Ben was arrested after a dispute with an airline stewardess regarding his carry on baggage. He was released on bail and flew back to Europe a few days later.

Mixed martial arts record

|-
| Loss
| align=center| 0-2
| Renzo Gracie
| Submission (gi choke)
| WCC 1 - First Strike
| 
| align=center| 1
| align=center| 2:38
| Charlotte, North Carolina, USA
| 
|-
| Loss
| align=center| 0-1
| Erik Paulson
| Submission (guillotine choke)
| Shooto - Complete Vale Tudo Access
| 
| align=center| 5
| align=center| 0:38
| Omiya, Saitama, Japan
|

References

  Dutch Olympic Committee

External links
 Videos of Ben Spijkers on judovision.org

1961 births
Living people
Dutch male judoka
Judoka at the 1984 Summer Olympics
Judoka at the 1988 Summer Olympics
Judoka at the 1992 Summer Olympics
Olympic judoka of the Netherlands
Olympic bronze medalists for the Netherlands
Sportspeople from Nijmegen
Olympic medalists in judo
Ben Spijkers
Mixed martial artists utilizing judo
Medalists at the 1988 Summer Olympics
21st-century Dutch people
20th-century Dutch people